Puerto Arica is a town and municipality in the Colombian Department of Amazonas.

History
Originally founded by Peruvian refugees from the War of the Pacific, it was awarded to Colombia after the Salomón-Lozano Treaty. These refugees would later resettle in the settlement of the same name in northern Peru.

Climate
Puerto Arica has a tropical rainforest climate (Köppen Af) with heavy to very heavy rainfall year-round.

References

Municipalities of Amazonas Department